Genianthus is a genus of plants in the family Apocynaceae, first described as a genus in 1883. It is native to southern China, the Indian Subcontinent, and Southeast Asia.

Species

References

Secamonoideae
Apocynaceae genera
Taxa named by Joseph Dalton Hooker